In 2017, more than 20 pieces of Russian avant-garde from the Dieleghem Foundation (Toporovski collection, owned by Igor Toporovski) formed a nucleus in the exhibition From Bosch to Tuymans, A Vivid Narrative (2017), a (re)installation of the collection at the Museum voor Schone Kunsten (MSK). In 2018, however, the works from the Toporovski collection were said to be of doubtful authenticity by a group of art dealers and some scholars in The Art Newspaper and De Standaard. This resulted in the indefinite suspension of the museum's director, Catherine de Zegher.

Suspension of De Zegher, further controversy
Due to the problems surrounding the collection, the museum board ordered an audit of the event and suspended the then-director, Catherine de Zegher, pending this process.

Later, several Flemish museum directors critiqued the handling of de Zegher and the MSK. De Zegher held fast to her claim that they did all the necessary art historical research but could not produce evidence of this. Later it was also shown that de Zegher lied about two external experts having researched the collection. Both mentioned external experts denied having researched the collection A former exhibition in France featuring work from the Toporovski's was questioned as well, however in that case, the court had ruled the paintings to be real. The Flemish Parliament debated in February 2018 how to limit the adverse effects of this controversy for other Belgian museums. Following these events, several of the employees of the Museum of Fine Arts Ghent formally (anonymously) denounced de Zegher in a letter sent to city officials in late 2018.In the letter, the museum team officially withdrew their confidence in the former director, referring a.o. to her self-righteous attitude while in charge of the museum and her lack of people management skills. The team expressed their unwillingness to collaborate with de Zegher any further, in case she would be allowed to return to the museum. De Zegher disputes any wrongdoing. She and the City of Ghent closed the exhibition a month into the controversy. They terminated the contract with the owner so that the works could be returned. The latter stated that an investigation would be conducted to verify the authenticity of the works. Currently, the matter is in the hands of an investigating judge. Toporovski claimed that lab research already showed that several works are indeed from the proclaimed area and are thus real, however, no tangible evidence to this effect has so far been made public.

Support for de Zegher
After seven months of her suspension, 63 artists, among museum directors and intellectuals, published a letter supporting Catherine de Zegher. Among those to have signed the letter include artists Eija-Liisa Ahtila, Luis Camnitzer, Cristina Iglesias, Simryn Gill, Mona Hatoum, Giuseppe Penone, Luc Tuymans, and Cecilia Vicuña; art historian Benjamin H. D. Buchloh; Catherine David, deputy director of the Centre Pompidou in Paris; Bartomeu Mari, director of the National Museum of Modern and Contemporary Art in Seoul; and Ann Gallagher, director of Tate Modern's British Art collections. The letter reads:

On October 17, 2018, de Zegher organized a press conference. She stated that several of the show's works had since been tested in laboratories and were proven to contain materials dating from the period to which they were attributed. She compared her position to that of artists persecuted in Russian pogroms and herself being an Amazon fighting for art. She also repeated her earlier claim that art-historical research had been undertaken. However, she did not present any evidence to this effect, claiming instead that this evidence would be published in a book in 2019. During the entire controversy, de Zegher worked closely with reputation manager Ine Mariën (also present at the final press conference). In October 2018, Toporovski announced that several works were tested for their authenticity and proven to be real. He referred to the publication of a book regarding the controversy.

On November 5, the International Committee for Museums and Collections of Modern Art (CiMAM) issued a statement in support of Catherine de Zegher. The full statement reads:

Litigation and indefinite suspension 
Late January 2019, the city of Ghent formally lodged a complaint against de Zegher and the Dieleghem Foundation after strong evidence came to light suggesting documents about the loan - supposedly dating to 2017 and confiscated by the public prosecutor in early 2018 - had been forged. In reply, de Zegher attempted to sue the alderman of culture for libel, but the plea appeared to be ungrounded.

On February 22, 2019, de Zegher was suspended indefinitely as director, based on the audit findings that had started in 2018. She will not return to the Museum of Fine Arts but remains an employee of the Department of Culture. he city also announced that de Zegher remains subject to ongoing disciplinary proceedings, pending a possible definite dismissal.

In December 2019, the Belgian newspaper De Standaard reported that Igor Toporovski and his wife Olga Toporovski were arrested and kept in provisional detention at Ghent's prison due to the potential fraud in regard with the Toporovski collection. However, they were released with specific conditions awaiting their trial. She retired in 2020.

References 

Museum events
Avant-garde art
Art controversies